Karen Khachanov was the defending champion, but withdrew before the tournament began.

Stefanos Tsitsipas won the title, defeating Mikhail Kukushkin in the final, 7–5, 7–6(7–5).

Seeds
The top four seeds received a bye into the second round.

Draw

Finals

Top half

Bottom half

Qualifying

Seeds

Qualifiers

Lucky losers

Qualifying draw

First qualifier

Second qualifier

Third qualifier

Fourth qualifier

References
 Main draw
 Qualifying draw

Open 13 Provence - Singles
2019 Singles
2019 in French tennis